For other places with the same name, see Rattlesnake Island (disambiguation).

Rattlesnake Island is an island located on Clear Lake in Lake County, northern California. Its land area is nominally , but may vary significantly as lake levels rise and fall.

There is evidence of Native American activity on the island, possibly dating back as much as 8,000 years, although little archaeological work has been conducted. This site is connected with the prehistoric Post Pattern, and has probably been used by the Southeastern Pomo throughout prehistoric times. The Elem Pomo Colony have claimed the island to be their place of origin, and a political and religious center.

A history of ownership disputes dates as far back as the late nineteenth century. At present, legal title to the island is held by a Bay Area businessman, John Nady (founder of Nady Systems, Inc.) His 2003 attempt to obtain permits to construct a log cabin on the island was challenged by Elem Indian Colony members but eventually granted. John Parker, a local archaeologist, petitioned the federal government to add the island to the National Register of Historical Places. John Nady is currently developing a sustainable vacation home there with solar power and resident livestock.

References

Nady Systems - About Us

External links
 Lake County News article on Board of Supervisors vote to allow construction to proceed
 Article in Anderson Valley Advertiser on the history of the island and dispute
 Website describing issue from Elem point of view with links to other articles
 "The Struggle for Rattlesnake Island", Free Speech Radio News, radio documentary, air-date November 24, 2011. Audio download.
 Elem Nation of Pomo official website (under construction)

Lake islands of California
Islands of Lake County, California
Native American history of California
Islands of California
Islands of Northern California